Kolkat may refer to:
 Kolkata, India, also known as Calcutta
 Geghadir, Shirak, Armenia
 Kolkat, Iran, a village in Mazandaran Province